Edward Band (7 January 1886 – 22 March 1971) was an English Presbyterian missionary and schoolteacher. He spent the most significant portion of his career in Taiwan, arriving in 1912 and leaving in 1940. He was the first missionary in Taiwan to be sent to Japan to learn Japanese after the transfer of power from the Qing dynasty to the Japanese government. He taught at and was eventually principal of Tainan's Presbyterian Church High School, renamed  in 1939, and was said to have been responsible for introducing association football to the island.

Band authored two books; Barclay of Formosa (1936), a biography of fellow missionary Thomas Barclay, and Working His Purpose Out (1947), a history of the English Presbyterian Mission published on the mission's centenary in 1947.

References

Bibliography

Presbyterian missionaries in Taiwan
English Presbyterian missionaries
British expatriates in Taiwan
1886 births
1971 deaths
Heads of schools in Taiwan
British schoolteachers
People from Birkenhead